The Anconine Republic was a revolutionary municipality formed on 19 November 1797. It came about after a French victory at Ancona in February 1797, and the consequent occupation of the city. It existed in the region of Marche, with Ancona serving as its capital. Despite the Treaty of Campo Formio stating that Ancona and the surrounding region had to be returned to the Papal States, the municipality proclaimed the decadence of papal rule, under French protection. The subsequent tension led to general conflict with Pope Pius VI and the French occupation of the whole of the Papal States. Ancona was incorporated into the Roman Republic on 7 March 1798. It had a consul as its head.

Ancona is now a province of Italy, in the central part of the country on the Adriatic Sea.

References

States and territories established in 1797
States and territories disestablished in 1798
French military occupations
Client states of the Napoleonic Wars
Italian states
History of Ancona
1797 establishments in Italy
1798 disestablishments in Europe